The 1847 Georgia gubernatorial election was held on October 4, 1847.

The Democratic candidate George W. Towns won election over Whig challenger Duncan L. Clinch. Clinch lost by 1,278 votes.

General election

Candidates

Democratic 

 George W. Towns, former house representative.

Whig 

 Duncan Lamont Clinch, former house representative.

Results

References 

Georgia (U.S. state) gubernatorial elections
Georgia
Gubernatorial